Schweizer (German meaning 'Swiss') may refer to:

People
 Bernard Schweizer (born 1962), American professor of English
 Eduard Schweizer (1913–2006), Swiss New Testament scholar
 Irène Schweizer (born 1941), Swiss Jazz pianist
 J. Otto Schweizer (March 27, 1863–1955) Swiss-American sculptor
 Julián Schweizer (born 1998), Uruguayan surfer
 Karissa Schweizer, American long-distance runner
 Kaspar Gottfried Schweizer (1816-1873), Swiss astronomer
 Katja Schweizer (nee Weisser) (born 1978), German curler and coach
 Matthias Eduard Schweizer (1818–1860), chemist, inventor of the Schweizer's reagent
 Peter Schweizer (born 1964), American author
 Schweizer brothers (Paul, William, and Ernest), brothers and founders of Schweizer Aircraft

Other uses
 Schweizer (chicken)
 Schweizer Aircraft, an American producer of sailplanes and helicopters, owned by Sikorsky Aircraft since 2004
 Schweizer-Reneke, a town in the North West Province of South Africa
 Swiss (people)

See also
 Schweitzer
 Swiss franc (Schweizer Franken)

German-language surnames
German toponymic surnames
Ethnonymic surnames